Pakistan Bait-ul-Mal (PBM) is a charity and social welfare organisation to help the poor and needy in Pakistan. PBM is a semi-autonomous body set up through a 1992 Act of the Government of Pakistan.

Mission and objectives
Pakistan Bait-ul-Mal significantly contributes to poverty alleviation through its various projects, including providing assistance to the destitute, widows, orphans, invalids, and other needy persons in the society. It provides financial assistance to the needy with emphasis on rehabilitation. PBM is assisting the poor in a variety of areas with the government funds.

Programs
Special Program that provides financial help to deserving poor people earning less than Rupees10,000 a month
Educational assistance to the needy and orphans and financial aid for the non-affording and deserving students for higher professional education
Residential accommodation in shelter homes for the deserving homeless and abandoned elderly people
Set up free hospitals and rehabilitation centers for the poor to provide free medical treatment
Financial aid and grants to charitable institutions with educational & vocational training programs
Sponsor and promote self-employment schemes
Provide relief to the needy and poor during natural disasters

Pakistan Bait-ul-Mal also is the sponsor of Benazir Income Support Programme. It also
provides money to poor and deserving students of almost all universities of Pakistan.

References

External links

Charities based in Pakistan
Welfare in Pakistan
1992 establishments in Pakistan
Organizations established in 1992
Pakistan federal departments and agencies